Donald S. Joyce (February 9, 1944 – July 22, 2015) was an American musician who was a member of the experimental music group Negativland. He also hosted a weekly radio program called Over the Edge on the Berkeley, California, radio station KPFA, for more than 30 years.

Joyce was born in Keene, New Hampshire. Originally a visual artist, he earned a master's degree in painting from the Rhode Island School of Design before moving to the Bay Area, where he lived most of his life. While working at KPFA hosting a more mainstream type music show, he encountered Ian Allen and other members of Negativland. Don was a master at tape editing and he began developing his sound collage techniques using radio and television broadcasts captured on tape and blending them into layered mixes, each with a unique theme.

 Heavily influenced by Bob and Ray and the Firesign Theater, Joyce developed a number of continuing characters whom he would portray in the more theatrical episodes of Over The Edge.

In 1984, he coined the phrase culture jamming. Using his alter ego, cultural reviewer Crosley Bendix, he presented an explanation of culture jamming and its importance on the 1984 album Over the Edge Vol. 1: JAMCON'84:

As awareness of how the media environment we occupy affects and directs our inner life grows, some resist. The skillfully reworked billboard . . . directs the public viewer to a consideration of the original corporate strategy. The studio for the cultural jammer is the world at large.Mark Dery, The Merry Pranksters And the Art of the Hoax. New York Times, 1990-12-23.

Death 
Joyce died of heart failure in Oakland, California on July 22, 2015 at the age of 71. He was cremated, and the band packaged two grams of his remains with the first 1000 CD copies of Negativland's 2016 album Over the Edge Vol. 9: The Chopping Channel. 750 of his O.T.E. and live show Fidelipac audio carts were also sent along with those ashes. Don's remains became a viral story on the internet.

Following Joyce's death, Filmmaker Ryan Worsley directed an 80-minute documentary, How Radio Isn't Done, featuring surviving members of Negativland as well as archival footage of Joyce himself.

References

External links
 Interview with Don Joyce from Some Assembly Required blog (August 2009)
 A few words on Don Joyce, by Jon Leidecker, a fan, a friend, and long-time collaborator 
 Interview with Don Joyce from Perfect Sound Forever (June 2000)

 
 
 

1944 births
Negativland members
2015 deaths
People from Keene, New Hampshire
American experimental musicians
Musicians from New Hampshire
American radio personalities
Rhode Island School of Design alumni
Rhode Island School of Design alumni in music